Thalheim is a municipality in the district of Brugg in the canton of Aargau in Switzerland.

Geography

Of this area,  or 49.9% is used for agricultural purposes, while  or 43.5% is forested. Of the rest of the land,  or 5.8% is settled (buildings or roads),  or 0.1% is either rivers or lakes.

Of the built up area, housing and buildings made up 2.4% and transportation infrastructure made up 2.7%.  40.1% of the total land area is heavily forested and 3.4% is covered with orchards or small clusters of trees.  Of the agricultural land, 17.9% is used for growing crops and 29.7% is pastures, while 2.4% is used for orchards or vine crops.  All the water in the municipality is in rivers and streams.

Coat of arms
The blazon of the municipal coat of arms is Argent a Grape Azure slipped and leaved Vert.

Demographics
Over the last 10 years (1997–2007) the population has changed at a rate of -6.3%. Most of the population speaks German (98.5%), with Italian being second most common ( 0.4%) and Portuguese being third ( 0.3%).

The age distribution, in Thalheim is; 58 children or 7.8% of the population are between 0 and 9 years old and 100 teenagers or 13.5% are between 10 and 19.  Of the adult population, 80 people or 10.8% of the population are between 20 and 29 years old.  68 people or 9.2% are between 30 and 39, 138 people or 18.7% are between 40 and 49, and 117 people or 15.8% are between 50 and 59.  The senior population distribution is 92 people or 12.4% of the population are between 60 and 69 years old, 53 people or 7.2% are between 70 and 79, there are 30 people or 4.1% who are between 80 and 89,and there are 3 people or 0.4% who are 90 and older.

, there were 32 homes with 1 or 2 persons in the household, 120 homes with 3 or 4 persons in the household, and 127 homes with 5 or more persons in the household.  The average number of people per household was 2.61 individuals.  , there were 285 private households (homes and apartments) in the municipality, and an average of 2.6 persons per household.   there were 143 single family homes (or 44.1% of the total) out of a total of 324 homes and apartments.  There were a total of 0 empty apartments for a 0.0% vacancy rate.  , the construction rate of new housing units was 1.4 new units per 1000 residents.

In the 2007 federal election the most popular party was the SVP which received 54.6% of the vote.  The next three most popular parties were the SP (12.3%), the CVP (7.8%) and the FDP (7.7%).

In Thalheim about 74.9% of the population (between age 25-64) have completed either non-mandatory upper secondary education or additional higher education (either university or a Fachhochschule).  Of the school age population, there are 46 students attending primary school in the municipality.

The historical population is given in the following table:

Heritage sites of national significance

The ruins of Schenkenberg castle are listed as a Swiss heritage site of national significance.

The village of Thalheim is designated as part of the Inventory of Swiss Heritage Sites.

Economy
, Thalheim had an unemployment rate of 0.67%.  , there were 61 people employed in the primary economic sector and about 29 businesses involved in this sector.  64 people are employed in the secondary sector and there are 7 businesses in this sector.  81 people are employed in the tertiary sector, with 21 businesses in this sector.

 there was a total of 394 workers who lived in the municipality.  Of these, 284 or about 72.1% of the residents worked outside Thalheim while 92 people commuted into the municipality for work.  There were a total of 202 jobs (of at least 6 hours per week) in the municipality.  Of the working population, 7.8% used public transportation to get to work, and 65% used a private car.

Religion

Of the rest of the population, there was 1 individual who belonged to the Christian Catholic faith.

References

Cultural property of national significance in Aargau
Municipalities of Aargau